Vasum muricatum, common name the Caribbean vase, is a species of medium to large sea snail, a marine gastropod mollusk in the family Turbinellidae.

Description
Vasum muricatum has a large, thick and heavy shell that reaches a length of  50 – 100 mm. The shell is quite elongated, conical or vase-shaped (hence the common name). There are blunt spines at the shoulder and near the base. The shell is off- white with black or dark brown periostracum externally, while the aperture is usually white. The columella has 5 strong folds, the first and third being the largest.

Distribution
This species is widespread in the Caribbean Sea. In Venezuela this species has been reported from the state of Falcon, Nueva Esparta and Dependencias Federales.

Habitat
This species is rather common and is often found in pairs in shallow water. It preys on worms and clams.

Gallery

References

 Rosenberg, G.; Moretzsohn, F.; García, E. F. (2009). Gastropoda (Mollusca) of the Gulf of Mexico, Pp. 579–699 in: Felder, D.L. and D.K. Camp (eds.), Gulf of Mexico–Origins, Waters, and Biota. Texas A&M Press, College Station, Texas.

External links
 orn, I. Von. (1778). Index rerum naturalium Musei Cæsarei Vindobonensis. Pars I.ma. Testacea. Verzeichniß der natürlichen Seltenheiten des k. k. Naturalien Cabinets zu Wien. Erster Theil. Schalthiere.
  Perry G. (1810-1811). Arcana: or the Museum of Natural History. pls. 1-48 (= 1810), pls. 49-84 (= 1811), unnumbered text pages. London: James Stratford.
 Röding, P. F. (1798). Museum Boltenianum sive Catalogus cimeliorum e tribus regnis naturæ quæ olim collegerat Joa. Fried Bolten, M. D. p. d. per XL. annos proto physicus Hamburgensis. Pars secunda continens Conchylia sive Testacea univalvia, bivalvia & multivalvia. Trapp, Hamburg. viii, 199 pp
 Lamarck,([J.-B. M.) de. (1822). Histoire naturelle des animaux sans vertèbres. Tome septième. Paris: published by the Author, 711 pp
 WoRMS
 ITIS
 Boldsystem
 Biodiversity Heritage Library
 EOL
 NCBI
 Smithsonian NMNH

Turbinellidae
Gastropods described in 1778